Franco Amurri (born 12 September 1958) is an Italian film director, producer and screenwriter, best known for directing films such as Da grande, which inspired the Tom Hanks film Big, Monkey Trouble and Flashback.

His father was the author and television writer Antonio Amurri. He has a daughter, Eva Amurri, with actress Susan Sarandon. He is married to Heide Lund, a sometime actress and producer with whom he has two children: son Leone and daughter Augusta. He also has two stepdaughters, Tallulah and Ruby, from Lund's previous marriage to Lord Antony Rufus Isaacs, son of Margot Rufus Isaacs, Marchioness of Reading.

Filmography

Feature films 
 Il ragazzo del Pony Express (1986)
 Da grande (1987)
 Flashback (1990)
 Monkey Trouble (1994)
 Amici ahrarara (2001)

Television 
 Il mio amico Babbo Natale (2005)
 Due imbroglioni e... mezzo! (2007)
 Due imbroglioni e... mezzo! – (miniseries) (2010)
 Love, Lights, Hanukkah! (2020) played the part of Giorgio

References

External links 

1958 births
Living people
Italian film directors
People of Lazian descent